This is a list of federations of trade unions currently in existence. Those federations listed under each country are also known as national trade union centres and are organizations formed by trade unions which operate, in most cases, at the national level. The organizations listed in the worldwide section are industry/sectoral-specific (i.e. the GUFs) and international organizations representing national trade union centres (e.g. ITUC).

Worldwide federations

Council of Global Unions 
The Council of Global Unions (CGU) is made up of ten global union federations (which affiliates national-level sectoral trade unions), the largest international federation of national centres (the ITUC) and the trade union body to the OECD (TUAC).

 Building and Wood Workers International (BWI)
 Education International (EI)
 IndustriALL Global Union
 International Arts and Entertainment Alliance (IAEA)
 International Federation of Journalists (IFJ)
 International Trade Union Confederation (ITUC)
 International Transport Workers' Federation (ITF)
 International Union of Food, Agricultural, Hotel, Restaurant, Catering, Tobacco and Allied Workers' Associations (IUF)
 Public Services International (PSI)
 Trade Union Advisory Committee to the OECD (TUAC)
Trade Union International of Agricultural, Forestry and Plantation Workers (TUIAFPW)
 UNI Global Union (UNI)

Other international federations 
 International Affiliation of Writers Guilds (IAWG)
 International Confederation of Labor (ICL)
 World Federation of Trade Unions (WFTU)
 World Organization of Workers (WOW)

Regional federations

Africa 
 East African Trade Union Confederation
 ITUC Regional Organisation for Africa (ITUC-Africa)
 Organisation of African Trade Union Unity
 Organisation of Trade Unions of West Africa

Asia 
 South Asian Regional Trade Union Council SARTU
 ITUC Regional Organisation for Asia and Pacific ITUC Asia Pacific

Europe 
 Council of Nordic Trade Unions (NFS)
 Eurocadres
 European Trade Union Confederation (ETUC)
 European Confederation of Independent Trade Unions (CESI)
 European Federation of Public Service Unions (EPSU)
 General Confederation of Trade Unions (GCTU)

Americas 
 Caribbean Congress of Labour
 Trade Union Confederation of the Americas (CSA-TUCA)

Middle-East 
 International Confederation of Arab Trade Unions

National federations

See also 

 List of trade unions
 List of international labour organizations

Notes 

Federations of trade unions